HaZvi (also Hatzevi, literally 'The Gazelle') was a Hebrew-language newspaper published in Jerusalem from 1884 to 1914 by Eliezer Ben-Yehuda, a  pioneer of the revival of Hebrew as a spoken tongue.

History
The first issue of HaZvi was published on October 24, 1884. It began as a weekly paper and eventually developed into a daily. In 1909, the paper had a peak circulation of 1,200 copies, 500 distributed in Jerusalem.

HaZvi revolutionized Hebrew newspaper publishing in Jerusalem by introducing secular issues and techniques of modern journalism, especially after Itamar Ben-Avi, Ben-Yehuda's son, joined the paper. Influenced by the French press, Ben-Avi brought in sensational headlines and a style of reporting that differed from newspapers of the old school. HaZvi  became the organ of the New Yishuv (pre-state Jewish community), as the first Jewish agricultural colonies were founded. The paper included translations of French literature (previously only German literature had appeared in translation) and original Hebrew prose. The need for Hebrew words to report the daily news prompted Ben-Yehuda to begin his lifelong project of compiling a Hebrew dictionary. All this fit in with the Hebraist ideology that was on the rise.

In 1908, the name of the paper was changed to HaOr ( 'The Light') due to licensing restrictions.

The paper was banned by the Ottoman government during the First World War due to its proposals for a Jewish homeland.

References

Bibliography
 Robert St. John. Tongue of the Prophets, Doubleday & Company, Inc. Garden City, New York, 1952.

External links

Archived issues of HaZvi 
HaZvi at Historical Jewish Press

Jewish newspapers
Hebrew-language newspapers
Jewish printing and publishing
Defunct newspapers published in Israel
Yishuv newspapers
Publications established in 1884
1884 establishments in the Ottoman Empire
1914 disestablishments in Asia
Daily newspapers published in Israel